The H&BR Class F3 (LNER Class N13) was a class of 0-6-2T steam locomotives of the Hull and Barnsley Railway.  They were designed by Matthew Stirling to work goods trains to and from the King George Dock at Hull which opened in 1914.  They were not fitted with vacuum brakes so they were not suitable for passenger work.

Dimensions
Sources disagree about some dimensions. Ian Allan gives 175 psi and  respectively. The locomotives were fitted with new boilers between 1926 and 1934 so it is possible that the boiler pressure was raised at this time.

British Railways
All 10 locomotives survived into British Railways ownership in 1948 but one was scrapped immediately and did not receive a BR number.  The remaining 9 were given BR numbers 69111-69119.

Withdrawal
The N13s were withdrawn between 1952 and 1956. The last N13 to be withdrawn was number 69114 and it was the last H&BR locomotive to remain in service. None are preserved.

References

F3
0-6-2T locomotives
Hawthorn Leslie and Company locomotives
Railway locomotives introduced in 1913
Scrapped locomotives
Standard gauge steam locomotives of Great Britain

Freight locomotives